Jamaal Lascelles (born 11 November 1993) is an English professional footballer who plays as a centre-back and captains  club Newcastle United. Lascelles previously played for Nottingham Forest, where he was developed through its youth academy.

Club career

Nottingham Forest
Lascelles was born in Derby, Derbyshire. His father Tim Lascelles was a professional basketballer that played for Derby Trailblazers. He began his career at Nottingham Forest, progressing through the club's youth system. In January 2011, the club rejected a £5 million offer from Arsenal for him. He signed his first professional contract in March 2011. Lascelles made his first-team debut on 31 January 2012, starting in a 2–0 defeat to Burnley.

Loan to Stevenage
In March 2012, Lascelles joined League One club Stevenage, on loan until the end of the 2011–12 season. He made his debut for Stevenage on 13 March 2012, coming on as a 69th-minute substitute in a 1–0 home win over Oldham Athletic, playing in the right-back position. He made his first starting appearance in Stevenage's 6–0 away victory at Yeovil Town on 14 April 2012, scoring the club's fourth goal with a header from Luke Freeman's cross. Lascelles also provided the assist for Patrick Agyemang's goal in the same game. He remained as a first-team regular from then onwards, playing the remaining four games of the regular season as Stevenage secured a League One play-off spot. Lascelles also played in both play-off matches, as Stevenage lost 1–0 on aggregate to Sheffield United. He made nine appearances during his two-month loan spell, scoring once.

Return to Nottingham Forest
On 7 August 2012, Lascelles signed a new four-year contract with Nottingham Forest. He made a total of three appearances in all competitions in the 2012–13 season.

Lascelles broke into the starting line-up in the 2013–14 season, forming a central defensive partnership with Jack Hobbs and making a total of 29 league appearances. On 22 January 2014, Everton were fined £45,000 by the FA over an "unauthorised approach" to Lascelles in 2010 while he was still a youth player at Nottingham Forest. Lascelles was warned as to his future conduct. On 18 March, Lascelles extended his contract in a new four-and-a-half-year deal. A reported £4 million bid from Queens Park Rangers was rejected by the club in July.

Newcastle United

On 9 August 2014, Lascelles signed a contract with Premier League club Newcastle United, joining on the same day as Forest teammate Karl Darlow. As part of the deal, both players were loaned back to Nottingham Forest for the 2014–15 season.

Lascelles returned to Newcastle for the 2015–16 season and made his debut for the club on 25 August 2015, against Northampton Town in the League Cup. He made his league debut on 3 October, as a substitute in a 6–1 defeat at Manchester City. Lascelles found first-team football hard to come by and did not make his first league start for Newcastle until 23 January 2016, when he played in the 2–1 defeat to Watford, capping his performance with a goal. Lascelles publicly criticised the mentality of his teammates after a 3–1 loss to Southampton on 11 April 2016, questioning their character and desire. Following injuries to first choice centre-backs Chancel Mbemba and Fabricio Coloccini, Lascelles was given regular minutes under new manager Rafael Benítez and gradually stepped up his game, grabbing his second goal for the club in the 3–0 win over Swansea City on 16 April. Lascelles totalled 18 appearances in his first Premier League season, but could not prevent the club getting relegated.

On 4 August 2016, Lascelles was chosen by Benítez to become the new Newcastle United team captain, succeeding the departed Fabricio Coloccini. Benítez had been impressed by Lascelles' willingness to speak up in the dressing room, in particular his criticism of more senior players in the defeat to Southampton. Despite requiring a double hernia operation, Lascelles played through the pain barrier for the last four months of the 2016–17 season, determined to see the campaign out and ultimately captaining the club to promotion back to the Premier League. His solid performances at the beginning of the 2017–18 season led to him being nominated for the September Premier League Player of the Month award, which was eventually won by Harry Kane. On 6 October 2017, he signed a new six-year contract with Newcastle, keeping him at the club until 2023.

In October 2017, he had a training ground fight with teammate Mohamed Diamé. The two players later apologised and offered to take the entire first-team squad and staff out for lunch.

In October 2018 he signed a new contract until 2024.

In November 2019 he suffered a knee injury.

On 27 February 2021, he scored his first goal of the 2020–21 season, in a 1–1 home draw against Wolverhampton Wanderers.

International career
Lascelles has represented England at all youth international levels from under-18 to under-21.

On 28 May 2013, he was named in manager Peter Taylor's 21-man squad for the 2013 FIFA U-20 World Cup. He made his debut on 16 June, in a 3–0 win in a warm-up game against Uruguay.

On 27 February 2014, Lascelles received his first under-21 call-up for the 2015 UEFA European Under-21 Championship qualifying match against Wales. He made his debut, and only under-21 appearance, starting in the qualifying match against Moldova on 9 September 2014.

Career statistics

Honours
Newcastle United
EFL Championship: 2016–17
EFL Cup runner-up: 2022–23

Individual
PFA Team of the Year: 2016–17 Championship
North-East FWA Player of the Year: 2017
Newcastle United Player of the Year: 2017–18

References

External links

Jamaal Lascelles profile at the Newcastle United F.C. website

1993 births
Living people
Footballers from Derby
English footballers
England youth international footballers
England under-21 international footballers
Black British sportspeople
Association football defenders
Nottingham Forest F.C. players
Stevenage F.C. players
Newcastle United F.C. players
English Football League players
Premier League players